Lee Min-hye (11 October 1985 – 12 November 2018) was a South Korean professional racing cyclist. Lee represented her country at the 2008 Summer Olympics in Beijing, finishing 19th in the points race. She achieved great success in a major international road racing competition at the 2010 Asian Games Individual Time Trial event by winning the gold medal in the  course in the time of 49 minutes and 38.35 seconds. She also competed at the 2012 Summer Olympics, in the women's omnium, finishing in 15th place.

In 2016, Lee was diagnosed with acute myeloid leukemia, and died on 12 November 2018.

Major results
Source: 

2003
 3rd  Scratch, UCI Juniors Track World Championships
2006
 Asian Games
1st  Individual pursuit
2nd  Points race
3rd  Time trial
 Asian Track Championships
1st  Individual pursuit
2nd  Team sprint
 Asian Road Championships
2nd  Time trial
3rd  Road race
2007
 1st  Individual pursuit, Asian Track Championships
 1st GP Rund um Visp
 2nd  Time trial, Asian Road Championships
 2nd Tour de Berne
2008
 2nd  Points race, 2007–08 UCI Track Cycling World Cup Classics, Los Angeles
2010
 Asian Games
1st  Time trial
2nd  Individual pursuit
 Asian Track Championships
2nd  Scratch
2nd  Team pursuit
2011
 Asian Track Championships
1st  Omnium
2nd  Team pursuit
2012
 3rd  Omnium, Asian Track Championships
2013
 Asian Track Championships
1st  Team pursuit
2nd  Omnium
2014
 2nd  Team pursuit, Asian Games (with Lee Chaek-Yung, Lee Ju-mi, Na A-reum, Son Hee-jung and Kim You-ri)
 Asian Track Championships
2nd  Team pursuit (with Lee Ju-mi, Na A-reum and Kim You-ri)
3rd  Omnium
2015
 3rd Time trial, National Road Championships

References

External links

1985 births
2018 deaths
South Korean female cyclists
South Korean track cyclists
Olympic cyclists of South Korea
Cyclists at the 2008 Summer Olympics
Cyclists at the 2012 Summer Olympics
Asian Games medalists in cycling
Cyclists at the 2006 Asian Games
Cyclists at the 2010 Asian Games
Cyclists at the 2014 Asian Games
Asian Games gold medalists for South Korea
Asian Games silver medalists for South Korea
Asian Games bronze medalists for South Korea
Medalists at the 2006 Asian Games
Medalists at the 2010 Asian Games
Medalists at the 2014 Asian Games
Deaths from leukemia
20th-century South Korean women
21st-century South Korean women